Paulo Sergio Gómez Sánchez (2 June 1973 – 2 December 2007), better known as Sergio Gómez, was a Mexican singer who was the founder and lead vocalist of the duranguense band K-Paz de la Sierra.

Biography
He was born in the city of Ciudad Hidalgo, Michoacán in 1973. In 2003, while working in the city of Chicago in the United States, he created K-Paz de la Sierra with other native Mexicans also working in Chicago. Gomez lived in Avon, Indiana, just west of Indianapolis.

Death
Following a concert in the state of Michoacán, while traveling in a car in the early hours of a Sunday morning, Gómez and several other vocalists were abducted  by a group of gunmen. The other passengers were later released, but Gómez's dead body was found on Morelia's outskirts, bearing signs of torture. His body was severely beaten, with bruises all over his chest and abdomen; his face was burned with a cigarette lighter, and had signs of strangling. Early evidence suggests that the murder might have been premeditated as Sergio had been warned  not to play in the city of Morelia, a stronghold for drug related gangs.

On 6 December 2007 Gómez, as well as another murdered Mexican musician, Valentín Elizalde, El Gallito were nominated posthumously for the Grammy Awards.

See also
K-Paz de la Sierra (band that Gómez created)

References

External links
Sergio Gómez Trib

1973 births
2007 deaths
20th-century Mexican male singers
21st-century Mexican male singers
Singers from Michoacán
Duranguense musicians
People murdered by Mexican drug cartels
People from Avon, Indiana
Missing person cases in Mexico
International Writing Program alumni
Mexican murder victims
American people of Mexican descent